The Romanian Police is the national police force and main civil law enforcement agency in Romania. It is subordinated to the Ministry of Internal Affairs and it is led by a General Inspector with the rank of Secretary of State.

Duties
The Romanian Police is responsible for: 
 policing in Romania
 the protection of the fundamental rights and liberties of the citizens and of the private and public property
 the prevention and identification of criminal offences and their perpetrators
 maintaining the public order and safety

Organization

General Inspectorate of Romanian Police is the central unit of police in Romania, which manages, guides, supports and controls the activity of the Romanian police units, investigates and analyses very serious crimes related to organized crime, economic, financial or banking criminality, or to other crimes which make the object of the criminal cases investigated by the Prosecutor's Office attached to the High Court of Cassation and Justice, and which has any other attributions assigned by law.

The organizational chart of General Inspectorate of Romanian Police includes general directorates, directorates, services and, offices established by the order of the Minister of Internal Affairs.

The General Inspectorate is under the command of a General Inspector appointed by the Minister of Internal Affairs. Since March 2015, the General Inspector of the Police is appointed by the Prime Minister and also holds the rank of Secretary of State.

Central units
General Directorate for Countering the Organized Crime - with five central directorates (Anti-Drug Directorate, Directorate of Combating Human Trafficking, Cyber Crime Directorate, Directorate of Combating Terrorism Financing and Money Laundering, Special Operations Directorate) and 15 regional Brigades of Countering Organized Criminality. These Brigades are specialized units and have the mission to fight against organized crime, drug trafficking, human trafficking, illegal migration, cyber crime, serious financial frauds, financing terrorism and money laundering.
General Directorate for Criminal Investigations - with three central directorates: Fraud Investigations Directorate, Criminal Investigations Directorate, Directorate of Firearms, Explosives and Toxic Substances.
General Directorate for Public Safety Police - with three central directorates: Public Order Directorate, Traffic Police Directorate, Transport Police Directorate.
General Directorate for Administrative Police - with four central directorates: Forensics Institute, Directorate for Criminal Records, Statistics and Operational Registry, Directorate for Logistics Management, the Directorate for IT&C.

Under the command of the General Inspectorate of the Romanian Police operates a specialized intervention squad, The Independent Service of Special Interventions and Operations.

Territorial units
The Romanian Police is divided into 41 county police inspectorates, corresponding to each county (județ), and the Bucharest General Directorate of Police.

Each county police inspectorate has a rapid reaction unit (Detașamentul de Poliție pentru Intervenție Rapidă, Police Rapid Intervention Squad). The similar unit attached to the Bucharest Police is called Serviciul de Poliție pentru Intervenție Rapidă (Police Rapid Intervention Service).

Equipment

Vehicles 
The Romanian Police has, altogether, roughly 10,500 intervention vehicles. The fleet is mostly comprised by Dacia Logans and Dacia Dusters, accompanied by older Volkswagen Passat vehicles. Mercedes Vito is yet another model in use, used by the special forces, border police and others. The Road/Traffic Police also has BMWs (mostly motorbikes), Seat, Lotus and Alfa Romeo vehicles, used for road chasing.

In 2020, the Ministry of Interior Affairs acquired 6,744 brand new vehicles which would also feature a new painting scheme, similar to those in Germany or Sweden. These were delivered in Autumn 2020 and had been produced at the local Dacia factory in Mioveni. A significant part of the acquired vehicles are Dacia Duster (2018 model year), being the first time a crossover SUV is introduced in the force on a large, nationwide scale and Dacia Logan (2017 model year, newest at the time of acquisition).

The police also uses helicopters for air surveillance and immediate response. The most common manufacturer is Eurocopter.

Weapons 
In 2020, the Romanian Police acquired 25,000 Beretta Px4 pistols, they had entered regular service by the end of 2020. The special services units (S.I.A.S. and S.A.S.) use Glock pistols and HK-MP5 submachine guns.

Ranks
Before 2002, the National Police had military status and a military ranking system (see Romanian Armed Forces ranks and insignia). In June 2002 it became a civilian police force (the first police service in Eastern Europe to do so) and its personnel was structured into two corps:

Corpul ofițerilor de poliție (Police Officers Corps) - corresponding to the commissioned ranks of a military force, to the ranks of Inspector, Superintendent and Commissioner in a British-style police force or to the both Corps de conception et de direction and Corps de commande et d'encadrement in the French National Police (Police Nationale).

Corpul agenților de poliție (Police Agents Corps) - corresponding to the non-commissioned ranks of a military force, to the Corps d'encadrement et d'application in the French National Police or to the ranks of Constable or Sergeant in a British-style police force.

See also

 Romanian Border Police
 Romanian Military Police
 Gendarmerie (Romania)
 Crime in Romania

References

External links

  Official site
 Facebook page